The Muddy Creek Archeological Complex is an archeological location Carbon County, Wyoming. The complex's three sites are dated to the Late Plains Archaic period. Stone points place the users of the site in the Besant Cultural Complex, representing one of the southernmost Besant sites. The sites were was  bison hunting and processing locations and feature many bison remains, as well as tipi rings. The complex was placed on the National Register of Historic Places on May 16, 2012.

References

External links
 Muddy Creek Archeological Complex at the Wyoming State Historic Preservation Office

National Register of Historic Places in Carbon County, Wyoming
Archaeological sites on the National Register of Historic Places in Wyoming